Faecalibacter rhinopitheci is a Gram-negative bacterium from the genus of Faecalibacter which has been isolated from faeces of a Black-and-white snub-nosed monkey from the National Park in Yunnan.

References 

Flavobacteria
Bacteria described in 2021